William Kenneth MacKenzie (December 12, 1911 — May 29, 1990) was a Canadian ice hockey defenceman. He played in the National Hockey League for the Chicago Black Hawks, New York Rangers, Montreal Maroons, and Montreal Canadiens between 1932 and 1940.

Playing career
MacKenzie was born in Winnipeg, Manitoba. He started his National Hockey League career with the Chicago Black Hawks in 1932. He also played for the Montreal Maroons, Montreal Canadiens, and New York Rangers. In January 1935 Bill MacKenzie was loaned to the New York Rangers, for the rest of season, for cash. In the Stanley Cup semi-finals Montreal Maroons defeated the New York Rangers, then defeated Toronto in the Finals. MacKenzie's name somehow was included on the cup, even though he was member of Rangers at the time the Maroons won the Stanley Cup. After the season ended MacKenzie was returned to the Maroons. He began the 1936 season MacKenzie played in the minors with Windos.  1936–37 Bill MacKenzie started with the Montreal Maroons, playing 10 game, but was traded to the Montreal Canadiens. 1938 Bill started the season with the Montreal Canadiens, before being traded to Chicago. He helped the Blackhawks win the Stanley Cup in 1938 getting his name of the Stanley Cup a second time (first time officially). He left the NHL after the 1940 season. He played several more seasons in the AHL before retiring from hockey after 1945.

Career statistics

Regular season and playoffs

Awards and achievements
Memorial Cup Championship (1931)
Stanley Cup Championship (1938)
IAHL Second All-Star Team (1940)
AHL First All-Star Team (1941 & 1942)
Calder Cup (AHL) Championship (1941)
AHL Second All-Star Team (1943)
Honoured Member of the Manitoba Hockey Hall of Fame

External links

1911 births
1990 deaths
Canadian expatriate ice hockey players in the United States
Canadian ice hockey defencemen
Chicago Blackhawks players
Cleveland Barons (1937–1973) players
Elmwood Millionaires players
Montreal Canadiens players
Montreal Maroons players
New York Rangers players
Ice hockey people from Winnipeg
Stanley Cup champions
Windsor Bulldogs (1929–1936) players